4 March 1956 Stadium, or officially Stade du 4-mars-1956, is a multi-use stadium in Tébessa, Algeria.It is currently used mostly for football matches and athletics stadium is the home ground of US Tébessa.  The stadium holds 11,000 spectators.

References

4 Mars
Buildings and structures in Tébessa Province
1992 establishments in Algeria
Sports venues completed in 1992